Renicks Valley is an unincorporated community in Greenbrier County, West Virginia, United States.

The community was named after Major William Renick, a pioneer settler.

References

Unincorporated communities in Greenbrier County, West Virginia
Unincorporated communities in West Virginia